Anthony Funnell (born 20 August 1957) is an English retired professional football forward who played in the Football League for Bournemouth, Gillingham, Brentford and Southampton. After dropping into non-league football, he had a notable spell with Poole Town, making over 300 appearances and being inducted into the club's Hall of Fame in 2014. He later became a manager.

Playing career

Southampton 
After rising to prominence at Athenian League club Eastbourne United, Funnell joined Second Division club Southampton for a £250 fee in January 1977. He made quite an impression during the second half of the 1977–78 season, by scoring 9 goals to help the Saints clinch promotion to First Division with a second-place finish. The higher level of football during the 1978–79 season meant Funnell rarely figured in the first team picture and he departed The Dell in March 1979. Funnell made 20 appearances and scored 9 goals during his time with Southampton.

Vancouver Whitecaps (loan) 
Funnell spent the 1977 English off-season in Canada with North American Soccer League club Vancouver Whitecaps. He scored two goals in 10 games for the club, which fell to the Seattle Sounders in the first round of the 1977 playoffs.

Gillingham 
In March 1979, Funnell signed for Third Division club Gillingham for a then-club record fee of £50,000. He made 38 appearances and scoring 10 goals during just over a year at Priestfield.

Brentford 
Funnell joined Third Division club Brentford for a then-club record fee of £56,000 in March 1980. Not rated by incoming manager Fred Callaghan, he made only 23 appearances and scored six goals during his only full season at Griffin Park. Funnell departed the Bees in the summer of 1981, having made 35 appearances and scored 10 goals.

Bournemouth 
Funnell signed for Fourth Division club Bournemouth in September 1981 for a £5,000 fee. Under David Webb's management, he had the best season of his career in 1981–82, top-scoring 16 goals in 43 league games to help the Cherries to promotion to Division Three with a fourth-place finish. A back injury during the 1982–83 season ended Funnell's career in league football. He made 64 appearances and scored 22 goals during his time at Dean Court.

Poole Town 
Funnell dropped into non-league football and signed for Southern League Premier Division club Poole Town in 1983. In a long spell with the club, Funnell scored 127 goals in 308 games for the Dolphins. He was recognised for his service with a testimonial versus former club Southampton in May 1991 and was inducted into the club's Hall of Fame in 2014.

Managerial career 
Funnell had spells as manager of Dorset League club Hamworthy United and Wessex League club Wimborne Town.

Personal life 
Funnell's son Gary is also a footballer and represented non-league clubs Wimborne Town, Salisbury City and Poole Town, in addition to the England beach football team at international level.

Honours

As a player 
Southampton

 Football League Second Division second-place promotion: 1977–78

Bournemouth

 Football League Fourth Division fourth-place promotion: 1981–82

As an individual 

Poole Town Hall of Fame

Career statistics

References

1957 births
Sportspeople from Eastbourne
English footballers
Eastbourne United F.C. players
English Football League players
Southampton F.C. players
Vancouver Whitecaps (1974–1984) players
Southern Football League players
Association football forwards
Living people
Gillingham F.C. players
Brentford F.C. players
AFC Bournemouth players
Poole Town F.C. players
English football managers
Hamworthy United F.C. managers
Wimborne Town F.C. managers
English expatriate footballers
English expatriate sportspeople in Canada
Expatriate soccer players in Canada
North American Soccer League (1968–1984) players
Newhaven F.C. players